Julie is a one-act chamber opera written by the Belgian composer Philippe Boesmans, who was composer-in-residence of the Brussels opera house, La Monnaie. It is based on August Strindberg's 1888 play, Miss Julie, with a libretto by Luc Bondy and  written in German.

It received its premiere production in March 2005 at La Monnaie and was subsequently seen in Vienna and as part of the July 2005 Festival d‘Aix-en-Provence. A live performance was recorded at Aix-en-Provence and released on DVD.

References

External links
 Interview with the Boesmans about Julie

2005 operas
German-language operas
Opera world premieres at La Monnaie
One-act operas
Operas
Operas by Philippe Boesmans
Operas based on plays
Operas based on works by August Strindberg
Works based on Miss Julie